Joseph "Krystel" Franz Freiherr von Jacquin or Baron Joseph von Jacquin (7 February 1766, in Schemnitz (now Banská Štiavnica) – 26 October 1839, in Vienna) was an Austrian scientist who studied medicine, chemistry, zoology and botany. 

The son of Nikolaus von Jacquin, he graduated from the University of Vienna as a doctor of medicine in 1788.

Between 1788 and 1791 Jacquin was sent on a scientific journey to Germany, France and England by Emperor Francis II.

He inherited his father's position as professor of botany and chemistry at the University of Vienna, which he held from 1797 until his retirement in 1838. In 1821, he was elected a foreign member of the Royal Swedish Academy of Sciences.

Notes

Publications
Jacquin, J. F. Beyträge zur Geschichte der Vögel. C.F. Wappler, Wien 1784.

Jacquin, J.F. Lehrbuch der allgemeinen und medicinischen Chymie zum Gebrauche seiner Vorlesungen. C.F. Wappler, Wien 1798.

Jacquin, J.F.,  E. Fenzl & I. Schreibers. Eclogae plantarum rariorum aut minus cognitarum : quas ad vivum descripsit et iconibus coloratis illustravit. A. Strauss, Wien, 1811–1844.

Jacquin, J.F.,  E. Fenzl & I. Schreibers. Eclogae graminum rariorum aut minus cognitarum : quae ad vivum descripsit et iconibus coloratis illustravit. A. Strauss et Sommer, Wien, 1813–1844.

Jacquin, J. F. Ueber den Ginkgo, Carl Gerold, Wien, 1819.

References 
 Allgemeine Deutsche Biographie

18th-century Austrian botanists
18th-century Austrian chemists
Austrian ornithologists
1766 births
1839 deaths
Barons of Austria
Members of the Royal Swedish Academy of Sciences
Austrian expatriates in Hungary
People from Banská Štiavnica
18th-century Hungarian people
19th-century Austrian chemists
19th-century Austrian botanists
19th-century Austrian zoologists